Up at "Minton's" is a live album by jazz saxophonist Stanley Turrentine recorded for the Blue Note label and performed by Turrentine with Grant Green, Horace Parlan, George Tucker, and Al Harewood. The album was originally released as two separate volumes on LP and later as a double CD set.

Reception
The Allmusic review by Scott Yanow awarded the album 4½ stars stating "Standards and a couple of blues make up the repertoire, giving listeners a definitive look at the soulful Mr. T. near the beginning of his productive musical life".

Track listing
All compositions by Stanley Turrentine except as indicated
CD 1
 "But Not for Me" (George Gershwin, Ira Gershwin) - 11:29
 "Stanley's Time" - 11:03
 "Broadway" (Billy Bird, Teddy McRae, Henri Woode) - 10:38
 "Yesterdays" (Otto Harbach, Jerome Kern) - 11:39
CD 2
 "Later at Minton's" - 13:55
 "Come Rain or Come Shine" (Harold Arlen, Johnny Mercer) - 8:34
 "Love for Sale" (Cole Porter) - 15:11
 "Summertime" (Gershwin, Gershwin, DuBose Heyward) - 7:14
Recorded at Minton's Playhouse, NYC, on February 23, 1961.

Personnel
Stanley Turrentine - tenor saxophone
Grant Green - guitar
Horace Parlan - piano
George Tucker - bass
Al Harewood - drums

Production
 Alfred Lion - producer
 Reid Miles - design
 Rudy Van Gelder - engineer
 Francis Wolff - photography

References

Albums produced by Alfred Lion
1961 live albums
Stanley Turrentine live albums
Blue Note Records live albums